The Pakistan national cricket team toured Australia in the 1999–2000 season to play three test matches against Australia before the tri-series with India. The tour began on October 26, in, Perth, Western Australia against an ACB Chairman XI as they played in four tour matches (two list a and two first-class matches before the first test which was played at the Brisbane Cricket Ground. The captains of the teams was Wasim Akram for Pakistan, and Steve Waugh for Australia.

In the opening test played in Brisbane, centuries from Michael Slater and Mark Waugh guided Australia to a ten wicket victory. The following test, played at Hobart saw Pakistan with a century from Inzamam-ul-Haq and a six wicket haul in the first innings from Saqlain Mushtaq give Australia a target of 369 runs to chase down. In what was a record breaking run-chase, centuries from Justin Langer and Adam Gilchrist aided Australia to a four wicket win and also taking the series with one game to spare. The final test which was played at Perth saw a 337-run partnership between Ricky Ponting and Justin Langer as they led Australia to 451 which would be enough as they won by an innings and twenty runs.

Australian batsman, Justin Langer top scored for the series with 331 runs which included two centuries as he finished ahead of Michael Slater and Pakistani batsman, Saeed Anwar. In the bowling, Damien Fleming was the leading wicket taker of the series with 18 wickets which included a five wicket inning in Brisbane. He was followed by fellow Australian bowlers, Glenn McGrath and Shane Warne.

Test series

1st Test

2nd Test

3rd Test

External sources
 CricketArchive

References
 Playfair Cricket Annual 
 Wisden Cricketers Almanack

External links
 Pakistan in Australia, 1999-2000

1999 in Australian cricket
1999 in Pakistani cricket
1999–2000 Australian cricket season
2000 in Australian cricket
2000 in Pakistani cricket
International cricket competitions from 1997–98 to 2000
1999-2000